Charles Carpmael, FRAS, FRSC (19 September 1846 – 21 October 1894) was a British-Canadian meteorologist and astronomer. He was head of the Dominion Meteorological Service (now Meteorological Service of Canada) until 1894.

References

External links 
 http://www.biographi.ca/en/bio/carpmael_charles_12F.html
 https://www.rasc.ca/charles-carpmael
 https://www.thecanadianencyclopedia.ca/en/article/charles-carpmael

1846 births
1894 deaths
Canadian astronomers
British astronomers
Canadian meteorologists
British meteorologists
Fellows of the Royal Astronomical Society
Fellows of the Royal Society of Canada
Fellows of St John's College, Cambridge
Alumni of St John's College, Cambridge